The women's 100 metre butterfly competition of the swimming events at the 2015 Pan American Games took place on July 16 at the CIBC Pan Am/Parapan Am Aquatics Centre and Field House in Toronto, Canada. The defending Pan American Games champion was Claire Donahue of the United States.

This race consisted of two lengths of the pool, all lengths in butterfly. The top eight swimmers from the heats would qualify for the A final (where the medals would be awarded), while the next best eight swimmers would qualify for the B final.

Records
Prior to this competition, the existing world and Pan American Games records were as follows:

The following new records were set during this competition.

Qualification

Each National Olympic Committee (NOC) was able to enter up to two entrants providing they had met the A standard (1:01.49) in the qualifying period (January 1, 2014 to May 1, 2015). NOCs were also permitted to enter one athlete providing they had met the B standard (1:05.18) in the same qualifying period. All other competing athletes were entered as universality spots.

Schedule
All times are Eastern Time Zone (UTC-4).

Results

Heats
The first round was held on July 16.

B Final 
The B final was also held on July 16.

A Final 
The A final was also held on July 16.

References

Swimming at the 2015 Pan American Games
2015 in women's swimming